Rescue refers to operations that usually involve the saving of life, or prevention of additional injury.  

Rescue may also refer to:

 Rescue services
 Rescue squad

Places
 Rescue, California, USA
 Rescue, Missouri, USA

Literature
 Rescue, a 2010 novel by Anita Shreve
 Rescue, the former codename of Pepper Potts in the Iron Man comics

Television
 Rescue (UK TV series), a 13-part documentary series focused on air-sea rescue work
 Rescue (Philippine TV series), a Philippine public affairs television program hosted by Arnold Clavio on GMA Network

Music

Music groups
 Rescue (a cappella group), a Christian a cappella quartet of musical performers operating out of Gresham, Oregon
 Rescue (band), a five-piece alternative rock-folk band from St Albans in the United Kingdom

Songs
 "Rescue" (Echo & the Bunnymen song), the second single released by the band Echo & the Bunnymen
 "Rescue" (KAT-TUN song), the tenth single by Japanese boy band, KAT-TUN
 Rescue (Sanjay Mishra song), 2000; off the album Rescue (Sanjay Mishra album)
 "Rescue" (Lauren Daigle song), the third single from her third studio album, Look Up Child.

Albums
 Rescue (Sanjay Mishra album), 2000
 Rescue (Silverstein album), 2011

Video games 
 Rescue (1987 video game), a computer game published by Mastertronic in 1987 for the ZX Spectrum
 Rescue (1982 video game), an arcade game
 Rescue: The Embassy Mission, the Nintendo Entertainment System port of Hostages

Other uses
 World Life Saving Championships, biannual life saving sport event, styled Rescue
 Rescue – The British Archaeological Trust, British charity that campaigns for the protection of archaeology and cultural heritage
 International Rescue Committee, global humanitarian relief nongovernmental organization
Rescue (Marvel Comics), a identity given to Pepper Potts after getting her own Iron Man suit.

See also

 
 
 Rescuers (disambiguation)
 The Rescue (disambiguation)
 Animal rescue (disambiguation)